The Institute of Commonwealth Studies, founded in 1949, is the sole postgraduate academic institution in the United Kingdom devoted to the study of the Commonwealth.  It is also home to the longest-running interdisciplinary and practice-oriented human rights MA programme in the UK.

The institute is a national and international centre of excellence for policy-relevant research, research facilitation and teaching.  As a member of the School of Advanced Study, established in 1994, the institute works with nine other prestigious postgraduate research institutes to offer academic opportunities across and between a wide range of subject fields in the humanities and social sciences.

The institute's library is an international resource holding more than 190,000 volumes, with particularly impressive Caribbean, Southern African and Australian holdings and over 200 archival collections.

Notable academics

 Shula Marks, lecturer from 1963 to 1976
 Satyabrata Rai Chowdhuri, senior research fellow in international relations
 Krishnan Srinivasan, fellow from 2002 to 2008
 Susan Williams, senior research fellow

List of directors
 1949–1957: Keith Hancock
 1957–1965: Kenneth Robinson
 1998–2000: Professor Pat Caplan
 September 2009–present: Professor Philip Murphy

Notable alumni

 Richard Fell

References

External links 
Institute of Commonwealth Studies

Commonwealth Studies
 
Commonwealth Family
Educational institutions established in 1949
Caribbean studies
1949 establishments in England
Research institutes established in 1949